An officiant is someone who officiates (i.e. leads) at a service or ceremony, such as marriage, burial, or namegiving/baptism.

Religious officiants are usually ordained by a religious denomination as members of the clergy.  Some officiants work within congregations in some denominations and for specified ceremonies (e.g. funerals), as non-ordained members on the clergy team. Clergy/officiants differ from chaplains in that the clergy serve the members of their congregation, while chaplains are usually employed by an institution such as the military, a hospital or other health care facility, etc.

There may be more than one con-celebrant, but, even when a higher-ranking cleric is present, (save the Pope), there is only one principal celebrant.

Secular officiants include civil celebrants,  Humanist Society–appointed officiants,  Justices of the Peace,  marriage commissioners, notaries, and other persons empowered by law to perform legal marriage ceremonies. Many secular celebrants/officiants conduct the whole range of ceremonies which mark the milestones of human life.

See also
Celebrant (Australia)
Marriage officiant
Humanist officiant
Self-uniting marriage
Justice of the Peace

References 

Wedding ceremony participants
Christian worship roles
Religious occupations